Favorite Street is an album by the Rova Saxophone Quartet performing compositions by Steve Lacy recorded in Milan in 1983 for the Italian Black Saint label.

Reception 

The Allmusic review by Scott Yanow states "Lacy's scalar works, which include "The Dumps," "Moon" and "Snips," are ideal for the saxophone quartet, who really dig beneath the surface and understand the pieces, as Lacy has always understood Thelonious Monk. Lacy's thoughtful brand of freedom, the variety found in these originals (which range from swing to purposely rhythmically wooden melodies), and with the inventive rearranging by ROVA make this a continually surprising, colorful and adventurous set".

Track listing 
All compositions by Steve Lacy.
 "The Dumps" - 2:15
 "The Throes" - 4:34
 "Sidelines" - 5:12
 "Undone" - 6:56
 "Beeline" - 10:33
 "Moon" - 9:56
 "Snips" - 3:10

Personnel 
Bruce Ackley – soprano saxophone, clarinet
Andrew Voigt – alto saxophone, soprano saxophone, sopranino saxophone
Larry Ochs – tenor saxophone, sopranino saxophone
Jon Raskin – baritone saxophone, alto saxophone, clarinet

References 

Black Saint/Soul Note albums
Rova Saxophone Quartet albums
1984 albums